Long jump world record progression may refer to:

 Men's long jump world record progression
 Women's long jump world record progression